A fraud factory is a human trafficking operation in Southeast Asia (including Cambodia, Myanmar, or Laos) operated by a Chinese criminal gang. Fraud factory operators lure foreign nationals to scam hubs, where they are forced into modern slavery, to scam internet users around the world into fraudulently buying cryptocurrencies or withdrawing cash, via social media and online dating apps. Trafficking victims' passports are confiscated, and they are threatened with organ harvesting and forced prostitution if they do not scam sufficiently successfully.

Nomenclature 
The term fraud factory is used by Kenya's Ministry of Foreign Affairs for the activity of trafficking victims to Asia where they use digital media to meet westerners and sell them cryptocurrencies. In Chinese, the term "fraud industrial park" has emerged in reference to these operations.

Organization and ownership 
Fraud factories are operated by Chinese criminal gangs. The gang's traditional revenue stream of gambling reduced during the COVID-19 pandemic and their activities increasingly focus on fraud factories to regain lost revenue.

Human trafficking victims 
Between August and late September 2022, the Kenya embassy to Thailand facilitated the rescue of 76 trafficking victims. The victims were mostly Kenyan, but also include Ugandans and a Burundian. The criminal gangs who operate the fraud factories target young and educated Africans. In November 2022, one Kenyan died after a botched organ harvesting operation associated with a fraud factory in Myanmar.

Myanmar is also an emerging destination for international labour trafficking, especially along its border areas. Victims in Myanmar include nationals from throughout Asia, including China, Hong Kong, India, Indonesia, Malaysia, Nepal, the Philippines, Taiwan, and Thailand. Victims are lured by the false promise of high-paying jobs, and are trafficked through major cities like Yangon and Bangkok, and transit points like Mae Sot, Chiang Rai. They are then forced to work in "special economic zones" along the country's borders such as Shwe Kokko.

Operations 

BBC News reported the locations of fraud factories as being in Laos and Myanmar, notably in Kachin where the Kachin conflict is occurring, a factor that makes rescues difficult. The Japan Times reported that factories which initially started operations in Cambodia later switched locations to Laos and that victims were held special economic zones in Laos and Myanmar (and also specifically Myawaddy), as well as casinos in Cambodia.  The trafficked victims are lured with job offers, one victim the BBC of traveled to Thailand for a job before being driven to Laos. 

Fraud factory workers are trained to create online social media and dating personas which they use to built up trust with westerners and engage in fake romance scams with the goal of encouraging the westerners to buy cryptocurrencies. The targets of the bait and switch cyber crime were predominantly US citizens. The process of fraudulently building up trust with victims online in order to sell them cryptocurrencies is known as pig butchering.

The trafficked Kenyans were prevented from leaving unless they paid 1.2m Kenyan shillings and were threatened with forced sex work and organ harvesting if they did not meet work performance targets. Two victims who spoke to the BBC were rescued by Awareness Against Human Trafficking. Trafficking victims have their passports confiscated by the traffickers, some have returned to Kenya with broken limbs, as result of beatings from their captors.

Destinations 
Cambodia, Laos, and Myanmar in Southeast Asia are known fraud factory destinations. These countries are particularly vulnerable due to their strategic location next to China and weak law enforcement. Below are known cyber scam hotspots:

 :
 Sihanoukville
 Poipet
 :
 Golden Triangle Special Economic Zone
 :
 Myawaddy
 Shwe Kokko
 Mong La

See also 

 Slavery in the 21st century
 Cryptocurrency and crime
 List of confidence tricks

References 

Organized crime groups in China
2022 in Myanmar
2022 in Kenya
2022 in Laos
Slavery in Asia
Crime in Myanmar
Crime in Laos
Crime in Cambodia
Human trafficking in Myanmar
Human trafficking in Cambodia
Human trafficking in Asia
Cybercrime
Transnational organized crime